Lieutenant Colonel Henry Milling (died 30 December 1822) was a British Army officer who fought in the Napoleonic Wars.

Biography
Milling was commissioned a lieutenant in the 81st Regiment of Foot in 1801. He served with them in the Peninsular War and was severely wounded at the Battle of Corunna (16 January 1809).

In 1815 Milling was present on the Waterloo Campaign with the 2/81st Foot, but did not fight at the Battle of Waterloo, instead the  2/81st Foot remind on garrison duty in Brussels guarding the British Army's pay chest.

On 18 August 1819 Milling was promoted to lieutenant colonel. In 1822 Milling, from 81st Foot, was gazetted to the 93rd Foot, but retired a few months afterwards without having joined his new regiment. He died on 30 December 1822.

Family
Henry Milling was the brother of John Milling, of Shanlis, Ardee, County Louth.

Notes

References

Further reading
 "Lieutenant Henry Milling to be Captain-Lieutenant, by Purchase"
 "Officers to be a captains of a company in the undermentioned regiments ..."  "81st Ditto Captain-Lieutenant Henry Milling"
Captain Henry Milling to be Major
 "Major Henry Milling to be Lieutenant-Colonel without purchase"
 "Lieutenant-Colonel Henry Milling from half-pay of the Regiment, to be Lieutenant-Colonel, without purchase. Dated 12th, August 1819"
 "Ditto, Lieutenant-Colonel Henry Milling, from the 81st Foot, to be Lieutenant-Colonel, . vice Creagh, who exchanges. Dated 7th March 1822"

1822 deaths
Year of birth missing
81st Regiment of Foot officers
British Army personnel of the Napoleonic Wars
British Army personnel of the Peninsular War